José Carlos Gomes Filho (born October 4, 1979) is a Brazilian football player from Rio de Janeiro.

Biography
Zé Carlos was born and raised in Teresópolis in Rio de Janeiro state and has one sister. When Zé was 7 years old, he started his football career playing futsal at Clube Comary. Zé's fast play and scoring abilities were noticed by Mario Mendes, director of Fluminense FC. Mendes advised Zé to switch to the field game at Fluminense.

Later, Zé Carlos started his professional career at Ituano in São Paulo at eighteen years of age.

He was signed by Penafiel in September 2003.

He went to Bolivia to play for Jorge Wilstermann in February 2006.

Since 2006 he has been playing in the Macedonian First League.

External links
 Player profile on FK Rabotnički web page
 CBF
 

1979 births
Living people
Footballers from Rio de Janeiro (city)
Brazilian footballers
Brazilian expatriate footballers
Association football midfielders
Ituano FC players
Moto Club de São Luís players
C.F. União players
F.C. Penafiel players
Expatriate footballers in Portugal
C.D. Jorge Wilstermann players
Expatriate footballers in Bolivia
FK Vardar players
FK Cementarnica 55 players
FK Rabotnički players
Expatriate footballers in North Macedonia
Brazilian expatriate sportspeople in North Macedonia